For the 1945 Vuelta a España, the field consisted of 52 riders; 26 finished the race.

By rider

By nationality

References

1945 Vuelta a España
1945